Toshkurovo (Tuşqır) is a rural locality (a village) and the administrative centre of Toshkurovsky Selsoviet, Baltachevsky District, Bashkortostan, Russia. The population was 436 as of 2010. There are 12 streets.

Geography 
Toshkurovo is located 18 km northeast of Starobaltachevo (the district's administrative centre) by road. Shtandy and Asavka are the nearest rural localities.

References 

Rural localities in Baltachevsky District